The final tournament of UEFA Euro 1976 was a single-elimination tournament involving the four teams that qualified from the quarter-finals. There were two rounds of matches: a semi-final stage leading to the final to decide the champions. The final tournament began with the semi-finals on 16 June and ended with the final on 20 June at the Stadion Crvena zvezda in Belgrade. Czechoslovakia won the tournament with a 5–3 penalty shoot-out victory over West Germany.

All times Central European Time (UTC+1)

Format
Any game in the final tournament that was undecided by the end of the regular 90 minutes was followed by thirty minutes of extra time (two 15-minute halves). If scores were still level after 30 minutes of extra time, there would be a penalty shootout (at least five penalties each, and more if necessary) to determine who progressed to the next round.

Teams

Bracket

Semi-finals

Czechoslovakia vs Netherlands

Yugoslavia vs West Germany

Third place play-off

Final

References

Bibliography

External links

 UEFA Euro 1976 official history

Knockout stage
1976
Knockout stage
Knockout stage
Knockout stage
Knockout stage
1970s in Belgrade
1970s in Zagreb
International sports competitions in Belgrade
Sports competitions in Zagreb